Diego Eugenio Becker (born 24 November 1997) is an Argentine professional footballer who plays as a midfielder for Instituto.

Club career
Becker was promoted into the first-team of Rosario Central during the 2016–17 Argentine Primera División campaign. He was an unused substitute on three occasions before making his professional debut in June 2017 against San Martín, featuring for the final twenty-seven minutes of a 1–1 draw. After twelve appearances for Rosario up until the end of 2018–19, Becker departed on loan for the 2019–20 campaign to Primera B Nacional's Alvarado. Becker scored for the first time on 13 October 2019 as he netted twice in a 3–2 victory over Estudiantes.

After a few loan spells, Becker finally left Rosario in January 2022 to join Instituto on a permanently deal until the end of 2022.

International career
Becker was called up for Argentina U20 training in October 2016.

Personal life
His brother, Pablo Becker, is also a professional footballer.

Career statistics
.

Honours
Rosario Central
Copa Argentina: 2017–18

References

External links

1997 births
Living people
People from Caseros Department
Argentine footballers
Argentine people of German descent
Association football midfielders
Argentine Primera División players
Primera Nacional players
Rosario Central footballers
Club Atlético Alvarado players
Club Atlético Tigre footballers
Instituto footballers
Sportspeople from Santa Fe Province